Lada Izhevsk is a subsidiary of the state-owned carmaking company AvtoVAZ based in Izhevsk, Russia. It was formerly a subsidiary of Izmash under the IzhAvto brand, and manufactured both motorcycles and automobiles. The company was given its current name in 2017.

History

IZh first proposed an automobile in 1958, with a prototype four-wheel drive for rural use, the NAMI 048 Ogonyok. It used a GAZ chassis and a  flat-twin engine based on the Ural M72. It was not produced in quantity.

The Izhevsk car factory was established in 1965 with French automaker Renault as the main contractor. The company started on 12 December 1966 with assembling copies of Moskvitch models 408 (as the IZh 408) with parts shipped in. By he end of the year, 300 had been completed, with the number reaching 4,000 by December 1967. In December 1967, the Moskvitch 412 replaced the 408 on the assembly line (as the IZh 412). 

Styling began to diverge from the AZLK originals beginning in 1970, when IZh kept two round headlamps instead of adopting Moskvitch's rectangular ones, and got a different grille. In 1971, the IZh-built 412 was redesignated 412IE. The IZh-built 412s had a reputation for being better quality than the Moskvitch originals.

In 1970, IZh designed a prototype five-door hatchback (with the same high liftover) and a delivery on the 412 platform. The delivery in 1972 became the IZh 2715; it was powered by a  inline four, had twin rear doors and a box-like cargo area (akin to a cube van ) and could carry a  load. It and a pickup (what hot rodders would call a pickoupe), announced as the 27151 in 1974, were very popular, both officially in production until 1997, with the final examples built as late as 2001. Pickups were occasionally bought as far away as South America and South Africa, but were forbidden to private owners in the Soviet Union. The 2715 delivery was used by the Soviet post office. A windowed version with rear bed seats, the 27156, appeared in 1987. The hatchback reached the market in 1975 as the 2125 Kombi, and it gave IZh another winning model.

IZh produced its one millionth unit in 1977. Between 1973 and 1979 IZh was one of the makes marketed by SATRA in the United Kingdom under the Cossack Motorcycles brand; the Planeta and Jupiter models.

Post-Soviet era

In the 1990s production declined due to a lack of financing and improper managerial practices, and by 1999 the plant was producing fewer than 10,000 vehicles a year. The company became an independent subsidiary of the weapons manufacturer Izhmash in 1996, when it was established as a separate company named DAO "Izhmash-Avto". It was ultimately acquired by the SOK Group in 2000. By 2003, the plant produced 94,200 cars including the Zhiguli and the Izh Oda. The Kia Spectra sedan was produced for the Korean carmaker under a 2005 partnership agreement. IzhAvto filed for bankruptcy in 2009.

Recent developments
Since its acquisition by AvtoVAZ in 2010, the plant has produced Nissan and Lada models, including Lada Granta, Nissan Sentra and Nissan Tiida. The plant is also one of the production sites of the Lada Vesta, which debuted in 2015. The decision to manufacture the Vesta in Izhevsk was taken by former AvtoVAZ CEO Bo Andersson, due to a higher perceived quality of production in the plant, compared to the group's main factory in Tolyatti. The plant built the 5 millionth car in December 2017.

Motorcycle production
The first IZh motorcycle was 1928's IZh 1, a 1200cc across-the-frame V-twin with shaft drive, designed by the  Soviet engineer Pyotr Vladimirovich Mokharov (1888–1934). They "owed a little" to contemporary DKWs. In the 1970s and 1980s, these motorcycles were sold in Britain under the Cossack and Neval brands. The company was the largest Soviet motorcycle maker.

Production of Izh motorcycles ended in 2008.

References

External links
 Official website
 

Car manufacturers of Russia
Vehicle manufacturing companies established in 1965
Companies based in Udmurtia
AvtoVAZ
Motorcycle manufacturers of the Soviet Union
Car manufacturers of the Soviet Union